Walter Heuer (born 26 June 1892, date of death unknown) was a Brazilian sailor. He competed in the O-Jolle event at the 1936 Summer Olympics.

References

External links
 

1892 births
Year of death missing
Brazilian male sailors (sport)
Olympic sailors of Brazil
Sailors at the 1936 Summer Olympics – O-Jolle
Sportspeople from Hamburg